The availability factor of a power plant is the amount of time that it is able to produce electricity over a certain period, divided by the amount of the time in the period. Occasions where only partial capacity is available may or may not be deducted. Where they are deducted, the metric is titled equivalent availability factor (EAF). The availability factor should not be confused with the capacity factor. The capacity factor for a given period can never exceed the availability factor for the same period. The difference arises when the plant is run at less than full capacity, in which case the capacity factor is less than the availability factor.

The availability of a power plant varies greatly depending on the type of fuel, the design of the plant and how the plant is operated. Everything else being equal, plants that are run less frequently have higher availability factors because they require less maintenance and because more inspections and maintenance can be scheduled during idle time. Most thermal power stations, such as coal, geothermal and nuclear power plants, have availability factors between 70% and 90%. Newer plants tend to have significantly higher availability factors, but preventive maintenance is as important as improvements in design and technology. Gas turbines have relatively high availability factors, ranging from 80% to 99%. Gas turbines are commonly used for peaking power plants, co-generation plants and the first stage of combined cycle plants.

Originally the term availability factor was used only for power plants that depended on an active, controlled supply of fuel, typically fossil or later also nuclear. The emergence of renewable energy such as hydro, wind and solar power, which operate without an active, controlled supply of fuel and which come to a standstill when their natural supply of energy ceases, requires a more careful distinction between the availability factor and the capacity factor. By convention, such zero production periods are counted against the capacity factor but not against the availability factor, which thus remains defined as depending on an active, controlled supply of fuel, along with factors concerning reliability and maintenance. A wind turbine cannot operate in wind speeds above a certain limit, which counts against its availability factor. With this definition, modern wind turbines which require very little maintenance, have very high availability factors, up to about 98%. Photovoltaic power stations which have few or no moving parts and which can undergo planned inspections and maintenance during night have an availability factor approaching or equal to 100% when the sun is shining.

See also
Availability (Reliability Engineering)
Generating Availability Data System (Electricity Industry)
High availability
List of energy storage projects
Utilization factor
Forced outage rate

References
Institute of Electrical and Electronics Engineers. Std 762-2006 - IEEE Standard Definitions for Use in Reporting Electric Generating Unit Reliability, Availability, and Productivity

Power station technology

ar:معامل الجهوزية